Peter Hamill may refer to: 
Peter J. Hamill (c. 1885–1930), American politician
Pete Hamill (1935–2020), American journalist

See also
Peter Hammill (born 1948), English musician
Peter Hamel (1911–1979), German screenwriter and director 
Peter Michael Hamel (born 1947), German minimalist composer